The Human Rights and Democracy Network (HRDN) is an informal grouping of 43 NGOs operating at the EU-level in the broader areas of human rights, democracy and peacebuilding.  It was created in 2004 and mainly operates in Brussels.

Purpose

HRDN aims at influencing the EU and its Member States’s policies and funding instruments to promote democracy, human rights and peace:

‘HRDN’s vision is that human rights and democracy are placed at the heart of the EU's internal and external policy agenda. This vision should manifest itself in an EU which effectively protects human rights at home and is a force for positive change in the world.’

Activities

HRDN members gather once every six weeks in Brussels to exchange information and discuss potential joint advocacy activities, for instance the preparation and publication of common positions and recommendations. Activities are coordinated by a troika, whose representatives are elected among the member organisations during the annual meetings of the network.

To draft common positions or organise joint events, informal working groups are temporarily established. All member organisations of the network can join these working groups. Current policy working groups are focused on the following issues:
 the European Instrument for Democracy and Human Rights (EIDHR)
 the European Parliament

Member Organisations
 Agir ensemble pour les droits de l'homme
 Amnesty International
 Association for the Prevention of Torture
 Christian Blind Mission
 Coalition for the International Criminal Court Conference of European Churches Christian Solidarity Worldwide
 CIDSE
 Club of Madrid
 DEMAS
 Euro-Mediterranean Human Rights Network
 European Association for the Defense of Human Rights (AEDH)
 European Partnership for Democracy

European Peacebuilding Liaison Office

Front Line Defenders

Harm Reduction International

Human Rights Watch

Human Rights Without Frontiers

ILGA-Europe

International Centre for Transitional Justice

International Dalit Solidarity Network

International Federation of Action by Christians for the Abolition of Torture (FIACAT)

International Federation of Human Rights (FIDH)

International Partnership for Human Rights

International Rehabilitation Council for Torture Victims

International Rescue Committee

Justitia et Pax

La Strada International Association

Light for the World

Minority Rights Group International

Open Society Foundations

Partners for Democratic Change International

Peace Brigades International

Penal Reform International

Plan EU Office

Protection International

Quaker Council for European Affairs

Reporters Without Borders

Save the Children

Search for Common Ground

Terre des Hommes International Foundation

World Coalition Against the Death Penalty

World Organisation Against Torture (OMCT)

World Vision International

References

Human rights organisations based in Belgium